Blackburn Cathedral, officially known as the Cathedral Church of Blackburn Saint Mary the Virgin with St Paul, is an Anglican (Church of England) cathedral situated in the heart of Blackburn town centre, in Lancashire, England. The cathedral site has been home to a church for over a thousand years and the first stone church was built there in Norman times.

History
With the creation of the Diocese of Blackburn in 1926 (taken from the Diocese of Manchester), the impressive parish church of St Mary the Virgin was raised to cathedral status. The church, which was built in 1826 and designed by architect John Palmer, now forms the cathedral's nave. It replaced the parish church that was demolished in 1819–1820.

In the early 1930s, fundraising began to enlarge the cathedral so that the building complemented its newfound importance. By 1938, enough money had been raised and work began on enlarging the new cathedral. Although work was interrupted by the war, it was resumed afterwards and continued through the 1950s and into the early 1960s. After the death of architect W.A. Forsyth in 1950, architect Laurence King joined the project and designed the distinctive lantern tower. The lantern tower, which consists of 56 different panes of coloured glass, with a modernist slender aluminium spire, was completed in 1967.

The cathedral was finally completed in 1977 and what had been built over the past decades was finally consecrated as Blackburn Cathedral that year.

The north transept contains eight misericords dating from the 15th century. It is not known at what time they arrived at the cathedral, but they are believed to have originated at Whalley Abbey. This could mean that they were removed to a builder's yard after the Dissolution, but with the cathedral not being built until the 19th century, this allows for the possibility that they had lain unused for some 300 years.

On 17 April 2014, the cathedral hosted the Royal Maundy service. In keeping with tradition, Elizabeth II handed out Maundy money to 88 men and 88 women. It was the Queen's first visit to the cathedral.

Dean and chapter

As of 30 November 2020:
Dean — Peter Howell-Jones (since 25 March 2017 installation)
Vice Dean & Canon Missioner — Rowena Pailing (since 5 May 2018 installation)
Diocesan Canon — Gary O'Neill (Interim Canon Precentor)
Residentiary Canon — vacant since 31 August 2022 resignation of Philip North

Music
The organist and director of music is John Robinson and the organist in residence is John Hosking.

Choir
The cathedral has seven choirs — Cathedral Choir of Boys and Men, Girls, Children's, Lantern Voices, YPC (Young Peoples' Choir), Renaissance Singers (Formally the Bach Choir) and Cathedral Consort (alternate Thursday Evensongs). On Sundays the Parish Communion is sung by the YPC and the Eucharist and Evensong by the Cathedral Choir.

Organ
A scheme for an organ in the west gallery was submitted by John Gray and partner Frederick Davison, two years before the consecration of the new church. The organ was opened on 28 February 1828 with a concert which included works by Handel - extracts from his Messiah and Israel in Egypt and his Occasional Overture played by the new organist Joseph John Harris.
Blackburn Cathedral has a world-class organ, built by JW Walker and rebuilt by Wood of Huddersfield. This is not only showcased to great effect through its use as an inspirational liturgical instrument, but also through the many recordings that have been made and in the regular lunchtime concerts and organ meditations that have taken place throughout the year.

Organists

Since 2019 the organist and director of music has been John Robinson. Previous organists have included Richard Henry Coleman, Charles Hylton Stewart, Herman Brearley, Thomas Lucas Duerden, John Bertalot, David Anthony Cooper, Gordon Stewart and Richard Tanner. The organist in residence (since 2022) is John Hosking.

Bells
The first mention of bells in the old parish church was in 1552 when the vicar and churchwardens purchased five bells from the Royal Commissioners for £26-12-1. A new peal of six bells was cast in 1737 from the metal of the existing bells and it was this ring of six that was moved over to the west tower of the new church in 1832. Four bells were added during 1851–52 to form a ring of ten.

In 1949, while extension work was being carried out in the cathedral, the current ring of ten bells was installed. All ten bells were cast by John Taylor & Co. of Loughborough. The tenor bell weighs 25-1-14 (1,289 kg) is tuned to D and has a diameter of 52 inches (1.32 metres).

Recent developments
In 1998 the lantern tower underwent restoration, being rebuilt in natural stone. The original 1960s tower had been constructed in concrete. The windows were also replaced.

Further work was carried out in 2000–01 to re-build the east end roofs and parapets and blend them into the existing structures. Upon completion of this work, the cathedral was finally deemed to be finished after over 70 years of construction.
	
As well as this rebuilding, a new piece of art was commissioned for the exterior of the building. It is deemed by many to be one of the most innovative pieces of modern sculpture at any English cathedral.

In 2009 the flagpole on the tower was renewed and topped with an ornate bishop's mitre finial, painted and gilded in gold leaf by Mark Bridges of Sussex and bearing the Lancashire Rose emblem.

The cathedral still forms an important part of the community. It is open to visitors and has a gift shop and café as well as hosting numerous events. In February 2011, the cathedral exhibited the Quaker Tapestry from Kendal.

In 2021, the crypt of Blackburn Cathedral was used as a major public vaccination centre against COVID-19.

Gallery

See also
Listed buildings in Blackburn

References

Further reading

External links

Blackburn Cathedral Website
A church was first recorded on this site in AD596

Blackburn
Cathedral
Church of England church buildings in Lancashire
Cathedral
Cathedral
Gothic Revival church buildings in England
Gothic Revival architecture in Lancashire
Grade II* listed buildings in Lancashire
Cathedral
Grade II* listed cathedrals
Basilicas (Church of England)